The Tidal River is a perennial river of the West Gippsland catchment, located in the Wilsons Promontory region of the Australian state of Victoria. A permanent camping ground which the river flows passed to the south is also called Tidal River.

Location and features
The river descends  over its  course.

The colour of the Tidal River ranges from a deep-yellow (in shallower areas) to a dark-purple and almost black (in its deeper depths). This discolouration is due to the large number of tea trees present in the area. The trees dye the river, making it appear like black tea (hence the name 'tea tree'). Even though the water is very clean and clear, it is impossible to see to the bottom in the deep areas. Few water creatures inhabit the river.

Etymology
As its name suggests, Tidal River swells with the tide. When a high tide occurs at the same time as a large amount of precipitation, the river can flood the tracks and boardwalks surrounding the area. The river runs into Norman Beach, one of the 'safer' beaches of the promontory. Because of its proximity to the beach and the types of rocks in the area, the Tidal River bed is composed purely of fine sand. The sand can be walked on when the tide it is low. However, it is very squishy and squelchy, due to the fineness of the sand particles mixed with the surrounding dirt.

Walking and hiking 
Tidal River settlement is the starting point of numerous short and not-so-short walks. Probably the most popular is the overnight hike, the Great Prom Walk, to South Point and the Wilsons Promontory Lighthouse on South East Point. South Point (the most southerly point of the Australian mainland) is mostly unremarkable of itself, and is easily overshadowed by South East Point, the site of the Wilsons Promontory Lighthouse.

One of the most popular walks for campers staying at the Tidal River campsite is the  Squeaky Beach walk, an enjoyable walk which passes over the ridge separating Norman and Squeaky Beach. As its name suggests, Squeaky Beach, squeaks when walked on (an example of Singing sand). This is due to the ultra-fine quartz sand particles, all of which are the same size and shape. The beach is very popular among children as it has many large rocks that can be climbed. The water, however, is very rough and often full of rips. The beach also has a small stream, similar in colour to Tidal River.

The campground

Tidal River is the main location for accommodation and camping in Wilsons Promontory National Park. Tidal River Campground has 484 camping and caravan sites (including 20 powered sites) situated near the beach and river. There are also 11 remote walk-in sites located within the park.

Tidal River camping ground is nestled in sand dunes behind Norman Bay, on the western side of the peninsula.

When fully occupied, the settlement of Tidal River swells to over  people. There is a visitor centre open daily, a general store which serves basic supermarket and emergency items, a service station, fish and chippery and café. The outdoor cinema, established in the late 1940s, is a nostalgic favourite amongst summer campers who will sometimes line up for over an hour before tickets can be bought so they can save a seat in the front row with a blanket.

During summer a ballot is held to allocate sites from Christmas until late January. Regardless of the time of year, all accommodation must be pre-booked.

See also

 Rivers of Victoria

References

External links
 Great Prom Walk

West Gippsland catchment
Rivers of Gippsland (region)
Camping in Australia
Wilsons Promontory